Patricia M. Davidson (born Canberra, 23/4/57) is an Australian nursing educator and Vice-Chancellor and President of the University of Wollongong. She is best known for her contributions improving cardiac nursing and transitional care with a focus on under served populations in a global context, and for her leadership in higher education.

From 2013 to 2021 she was professor of nursing and dean of the School of Nursing at Johns Hopkins University.

Davidson earned her BA (1985) in education and her MEd (1993) in education at the University of Wollongong, and she earned her doctorate in 2003 from the University of Newcastle (Australia).

Prior to joining Johns Hopkins University as Dean of Nursing in 2013, Davidson was a professor at University of Technology, Director at Curtin University, and member of the faculty of Western Sydney University.

Davidson is an advocate for nursing in the public sphere, and she is a regular contributor to letter to the editor and to op-ed including the Huff Post where she has written about updating the modern image of nursing through the "#WeGotThis" campaign and about the role of men in nursing

In 2016, Davidson signed an open letter to the faculty of Johns Hopkins University re-affirming the institutional commitment to supporting the LGBT community including gender affirming surgery.

In 2007, Davidson was inducted as a Fellow of the Australian College of Nursing. In 2013, she was inducted as a Fellow of the American Academy of Nursing, a Fellow of the American Heart Association, and a Fellow of the Preventive Cardiovascular Nursing Association.

Davidson received the outstanding alumni award from the University of Wollongong in 2013 and the alumni award for professional excellence from University of Newcastle (Australia) in 2014.

In September 2020 Professor Davidson was named as the next Vice-Chancellor of the University of Wollongong, replacing Paul Wellings in May 2021. She is the first alumnus of the university to fill the position. In August 2021 the title of the position was changed to Vice-Chancellor and President.

References

External links 

Google Scholar

Australian nurses
Living people
University of Wollongong alumni
University of Newcastle (Australia) alumni
Johns Hopkins University faculty
Fellows of the American Academy of Nursing
Year of birth missing (living people)
Academic staff of the University of Wollongong